Sürengiin Möömöö was a Mongolian linguist and chess player. He was born in 1930 in Khyargas, Uvs, and died on 7 July 2021 due to illness.

Linguistics career
Sürengiin Möömöö graduated from the National University of Mongolia in 1957 with a degree in Mongolian language, literature and linguistics. He then began a teaching career at that university which lasted over 50 years, becoming an associate professor in 1982 and a full professor in 1995. He obtained a Candidate of Sciences degree for his pioneering studies of Mongolian phonetics at Leningrad State University in 1970, and a Doctor of Science degree from the Humboldt University of Berlin in 1984 for his dissertation on Mongolian dialectology. He taught at the University of Warsaw from 1969 to 1973 and was a visiting professor at Osaka University from 1978 to 1980.

In 1982, Möömöö co-authored a book on Mongolian dialects with his student Yümjiriin Mönkh-Amgalan. He edited Damdinsüren and Osor's 1983 Mongolian Orthographic Dictionary, the standard source for Mongolian Cyrillic orthography until 2018. He was a member of the Mongolian Academy of Sciences, and was awarded the Order of the Polar Star in 2003, and the title of Honoured Teacher of Mongolia by President Nambaryn Enkhbayar in 2008.

Chess career
Sürengiin Möömöö competed in several editions of the Mongolian Chess Championship. He finished second at the 1955 championship, won it in 1958, and finished third in 1961.

In the first international chess tournament held in Mongolia (Ulan Bator 1956, won by Heinz Liebert), Möömöö finished in seventh place with 9/15, making the best score among the Mongolian participants. He tied for third with Andor Lilienthal in a tournament held in Tashkent in 1959, which was won by Alexander Grushevsky. In 1960, he played a match for the West Asian subzonal (a qualifying stage for the 1963 World Chess Championship) held in Madras, losing 1–3 to Manuel Aaron.

Möömöö played for Mongolia in three Chess Olympiads:
 In 1956, on third board in the 12th Chess Olympiad in Moscow, scoring +5, =4, -4;
 In 1960, on second board in the 14th Chess Olympiad in Leipzig, scoring +7, =2, -8;
 In 1962, on second board in the 15th Chess Olympiad in Varna, scoring +5, =6, -5.

Möömöö also represented Mongolia three times in the World Student Team Chess Championships:
 In 1958, on first board in the 5th World Student Team Chess Championship in Varna, scoring +4, =0, -5;
 In 1959, on second board in the 6th World Student Team Chess Championship in Budapest, scoring +5, =3, -5;
 In 1960, on second board in the 7th World Student Team Chess Championship in Leningrad, scoring +5, =0, -7.

Möömöö competed in the inaugural World Senior Chess Championship held in Bad Wörishofen in 1991, where he scored 6.5/11 and finished in a tie for 23rd place.

Publications

References

External links

Sürengiin Möömöö chess games at 365chess.com

1930 births
2021 deaths
People from Uvs Province
Academic staff of the National University of Mongolia
Mongolists
National University of Mongolia alumni
Saint Petersburg State University alumni
Humboldt University of Berlin alumni
Mongolian chess players
Chess Olympiad competitors
20th-century chess players